The S4 is a commuter rail route forming part of the Milan suburban railway service, which converges on the city of Milan, Italy.

The route runs over the infrastructure of the Milan–Asso railway.  Like all other Milan suburban railway service routes, it is operated by Trenord.

Route 

  Camnago-Lentate ↔ Milano Cadorna

Line S4, a radial route, runs from Camnago-Lentate, in a southerly direction via the Milan–Asso railway, to Milano Cadorna, the railway's urban terminus. The travel takes 42 minutes.

History
The S4 was activated on 12 December 2004 between Seveso and Milano Cadorna.
 
On 19 February 2006, the line was extended from Seveso to Camnago-Lentate.

Stations 
The stations on the S4 are as follows (stations with blue background are in the municipality of Milan):

Scheduling 
, S4 trains ran every half-hour between 06:00 and 21:00 daily.  After 21:00, the connection between Seveso and Milano Cadorna was provided by S2 trains between Seveso and Milano Porta Vittoria, connecting at Milano Bovisa-Politecnico with S3 services to or from Milano Cadorna.

See also 

 History of rail transport in Italy
 List of Milan suburban railway stations
 Rail transport in Italy
 Transport in Milan

References

External links
 ATM  – official site 
 Trenord – official site 
 Schematic of Line S4 – schematic depicting all stations on Line S4

This article is based upon a translation of the Italian language version as at November 2012.

Milan S Lines